Léa Khelifi (born 12 May 1999) is a French professional footballer who plays as a midfielder for Division 1 Féminine club Montpellier and the France national team.

Club career
A youth academy graduate of Metz, Khelifi made her senior team debut on 22 November 2015 by scoring a hat-trick in a 13–0 league win against CS Mars Bischheim. Khelifi scored eight goals for Metz during the 2018–19 Division 1 Féminine season. She scored 20 goals from 68 matches for the club in all competitions.

On 7 June 2019, Paris Saint-Germain announced the signing of Khelifi on a three-year deal. She joined Dijon in September 2020 on a season long loan deal.

On 30 June 2022, Khelifi joined Montpellier.

International career
Khelifi is a former French youth international. She was part of French squad at 2018 UEFA Women's Under-19 Championship.

Khelifi made her senior team debut on 23 February 2021 in a 2–0 win against Switzerland.

Career statistics

Club

International

Honours
Metz
Division 2 Féminine: 2017–18

Paris Saint-Germain
 Division 1 Féminine: 2020–21
 Coupe de France féminine: 2021–22

References

External links
 
 
 
 

1999 births
Living people
Women's association football midfielders
French women's footballers
France women's youth international footballers
France women's international footballers
Division 1 Féminine players
Division 2 Féminine players
FC Metz (women) players
Paris Saint-Germain Féminine players
Dijon FCO (women) players
Montpellier HSC (women) players